Huiscachani (possibly from Aymara wisk'acha viscacha,  -ni a suffix to indicate ownership, "the one with a viscacha (or viscachas)") is a mountain in the Vilcanota mountain range in the Andes of Peru, about  high. It is situated in the Cusco Region, Quispicanchi Province, on the border of the districts of Marcapata and Ocongate. Wisk'achani lies north of Chumpe and southeast of Alcamarinayoc.

References

Mountains of Peru
Mountains of Cusco Region